Food Chain is the fifth studio album by experimental post-hardcore band The Bunny the Bear, released through Victory Records on March 18, 2014. The album reached number 15 on the Billboard Top Heatseekers chart. It is the last album to feature founding clean vocalist Chris Hutka.

The album was announced in early 2014. The first single, "High Tides and Swimming Conditions" was released the following month with an accompanying lyric video. The album spawned three more singles, "First Met You," "Skyscrapers," and "The Seeds We Sow."

The track "Flying Like a Bird" was re-recorded from the band's 2010 debut album The Bunny The Bear. A deluxe version of the album was released as well, featuring four acoustic tracks from the band's Acoustic EP.

Track listing

Chart performance

Personnel

The Bunny The Bear
Matthew "The Bunny" Tybor - unclean vocals, additional clean vocals, songwriting, lyrics, bass guitar, producing
Chris "The Bear" Hutka - clean vocals

Additional personnel
Doug White - guitars, additional producing
Matthew McGinley - drums, additional producing, songwriting
Ali Lander-Shindler - album layout, photography
Don Duquette - keyboards, keyboards producing
Nate Blasdell - guitar on "Seeds We Sow" 
Kyle Collins - vocal producing
Sareena Dominguez - vocals on "Skyscrapers"

References

2014 albums
The Bunny the Bear albums
Victory Records albums